Michael Hammond Bates (4 December 1920 – 11 January 1978) was a British actor born in India. He was best known for playing Chief Guard Barnes who processes (and strip-searches) Alex (Malcolm McDowell) in A Clockwork Orange, Cyril Blamire in Last of the Summer Wine (1973–75), and Rangi Ram in It Ain't Half Hot Mum (1974–77).

Early life
Bates was born in Jhansi, United Provinces, India. His parents were of Cheshire families; his father, Henry Stuart "Harry" Bates (1893–1985), son of Albert Bates, of Congleton, Cheshire, was educated at Denstone School and Cambridge University before entering the Indian Civil Service in 1920. He served as Deputy Secretary of the Revenue Department and a Member of the Board of Revenue for the United Provinces of India until 1947 (in which year he was created CSI) and was later of the Colonial Office. Bates's mother, Sarah Clarke Walker (1896–1982) was daughter of William Hammond Walker, also of Congleton. Bates spent his early years in India, speaking Hindi and Urdu as his first languages before learning English, and remaining fluent in the former two languages for the rest of his life.

Having been sent home to England aged seven by his parents, Bates was educated at Uppingham School and his father's alma mater, St Catharine's College, Cambridge. He was commissioned in the Indian Army in March 1942. During World War II he served in the Burma Campaign as a major with the Brigade of Gurkhas and was mentioned in dispatches in 1944.

Career
In 1953, while an ensemble member with the Stratford Festival in Stratford, Ontario, Canada, Bates appeared in Richard III and All's Well That Ends Well.

In 1956, Bates appeared in Hotel Paradiso (L'Hôtel du libre échange), which starred Alec Guinness, at the Winter Garden Theatre in London. On radio, he played a variety of characters in the BBC's long-running comedy series The Navy Lark, including Able Seaman Ginger, Lieutenant Bates, Rear Admiral Ironbridge, the Padre, and Captain Ignatius Aloysius Atchison.

Bates appeared in many British television series, including Last of the Summer Wine from 1973 to 1975 (as Cyril Blamire) and It Ain't Half Hot Mum from 1974 to 1977 (as Rangi Ram). His role as Rangi Ram led to the allegation that he had performed in brownface. Series co-creator Jimmy Perry told Stuart Jeffries in 2003 that they had been unable to find a suitable Asian actor. "But Michael was ideal for the role", Perry said. Interviewed by the journalist Neil Clark for The Daily Telegraph in 2013, Perry said that all Bates wore "was a light tan. He wasn't blacked up! Michael spoke fluent Urdu, and was a captain in the Gurkhas". 
The show is not repeated in the UK by the BBC, who use the "blacked up" description of Bates's performance on their website's article about the series.

Bates's film roles include Bedazzled (1967) as the flirtatious police inspector, Here We Go Round the Mulberry Bush (1967) as Mr. McGregor, Battle of Britain (1969) as Warrant Officer Warwick, Oh! What a Lovely War (1969) as a Lance-Corporal, Patton (1970) as Field Marshal Sir Bernard Montgomery (to whom he bore a striking resemblance), A Clockwork Orange (1971) and Frenzy (1972). On stage, he played Shakespearean roles at Stratford and at the Old Vic, and made a big impression as Inspector Truscott in the West End production of Loot by Joe Orton in 1966.

Personal life
In 1954, Bates married Margaret M. J. Chisholm. They had three children: Rupert (who also became an actor), Camilla, and Jolyon.

Bates was a supporter of the Conservative Party. Peter Sallis described Bates as being "slightly to the right of Thatcher” politically and claimed that Bates's right-wing opinions contrasted so sharply with the left-wing views of fellow Last of the Summer Wine star Bill Owen that the series was almost not made because of their arguments.

Bates died of cancer on 11 January 1978 in Chelsea, London, aged 57.

Selected television roles

Selected filmography
 Carrington V.C. (1955) – Major Broke-Smith
 Dunkirk (1958) – Froome
 I'm All Right Jack (1959) – Bootle
 Bedazzled (1967) – Inspector Clarke
 Here We Go Round the Mulberry Bush (1968) – Mr. McGregor
 Hammerhead (1968) – Andreas / Sir Richard
 Don't Raise the Bridge, Lower the River (1968) – Dr. Spink
 Salt and Pepper (1968) – Inspector Crabbe
 Oh! What a Lovely War (1969) – Drunk Lance Corporal
 Battle of Britain (1969) – Warrant Officer Warwick
 Arthur? Arthur! (1969) – Mr. Harrington
 Patton (1970) – Field Marshal Sir Bernard Montgomery
 Every Home Should Have One (1970) – Magistrate
 The Rise and Rise of Michael Rimmer (1970) – Mr. Spimm
 A Clockwork Orange (1971) – Chief Guard Barnes
 Frenzy (1972) – Sergeant Spearman
 No Sex Please, We're British (1973) – Mr. Needham
 Fall of Eagles (1974) - General Erich Ludendorff 
 The Bawdy Adventures of Tom Jones (1976) – Madman
 Gulliver's Travels (1977) – (voice)

References

External links
 

1920 births
1978 deaths
People from Jhansi
British people in colonial India
English male television actors
English male film actors
Deaths from cancer in England
People educated at Uppingham School
Alumni of St Catharine's College, Cambridge
Royal Gurkha Rifles officers
Indian Army personnel of World War II
20th-century English male actors
British male comedy actors
British Indian Army officers